Podkraj is a settlement in the hills south of Velike Lašče in central Slovenia. The entire Municipality of Velike Lašče was traditionally part of the Lower Carniola region and is now included in the Central Slovenia Statistical Region.

References

External links
Podkraj on Geopedia

Populated places in the Municipality of Velike Lašče